The 1983/84 FIS Nordic Combined World Cup was the first World Cup season, a combination of ski jumping and cross-country skiing organized by International Ski Federation. It started on 17 December 1983 in Seefeld, Austria and ended on 24 March 1984 in Štrbské Pleso, Czechoslovakia.

Calendar

Men

Standings

Overall

Nations Cup

References

External links 
FIS Nordic Combined World Cup 1983/84 

1983 in Nordic combined
1984 in Nordic combined
FIS Nordic Combined World Cup